In the 2012–13 season, USM Blida is competing in the Ligue 2 for the 20th season, as well as the Algerian Cup. They will be competing in Ligue 2, and the Algerian Cup.

Squad list

Competitions

Overview

{| class="wikitable" style="text-align: center"
|-
!rowspan=2|Competition
!colspan=8|Record
!rowspan=2|Started round
!rowspan=2|Final position / round
!rowspan=2|First match	
!rowspan=2|Last match
|-
!
!
!
!
!
!
!
!
|-
| Ligue 2

|  
| 5th
| 14 September 2012
| 3 May 2013
|-
| Algerian Cup

| 4th Round 
| Round of 64
| 2 November 2012
| 8 January 2013
|-
! Total

Ligue 1

League table

Results summary

Results by round

Matches

Algerian Cup

Squad information

Playing statistics

|-
! colspan=10 style=background:#dcdcdc; text-align:center| Goalkeepers

|-
! colspan=10 style=background:#dcdcdc; text-align:center| Defenders

|-
! colspan=10 style=background:#dcdcdc; text-align:center| Midfielders

|-
! colspan=10 style=background:#dcdcdc; text-align:center| Forwards

|-
! colspan=10 style=background:#dcdcdc; text-align:center| Players transferred out during the season

Goalscorers
Includes all competitive matches. The list is sorted alphabetically by surname when total goals are equal.

Clean sheets 
Includes all competitive matches.

Transfers

In

Out

References

External links
 2012–13 USM Blida season at dzfoot.com 

USM Blida seasons
Algerian football clubs 2012–13 season